Chris O'Leary is an Irish Sinn Féin politician. He was formerly a Cork City Councillor and Lord Mayor of Cork. With a background in community development projects, in 2002 he was co-opted into the council to replace his Green Party colleague Dan Boyle who had been elected a TD. O'Leary left the Green Party in 2009, and was an independent councillor prior to joining Sinn Féin in 2010. He became Lord Mayor of Cork in June 2015, in the second year of a D'Hondt method rotation agreed for the office in 2014. He was Lord Mayor of Cork from June 2015 to June 2016, when he was replaced by Fine Gael politician Des Cahill. In the 2019 Irish local elections, O'Leary was not reelected, one of two Sinn Féin councillors to lose seats on Cork City Council.

His brother Don O'Leary was also a Sinn Féin Councillor for Cork City.

O'Leary is a patron of the People's Movement.

References

Year of birth missing (living people)
Living people
Local councillors in Cork (city)
Sinn Féin politicians
Lord Mayors of Cork